"OK Not to Be OK" is a song by American music producer Marshmello and singer Demi Lovato. It was released on September 10, 2020, via Island Records and Joytime Collective, in partnership with the Hope For The Day suicide prevention movement. The song was later included on the expanded edition of Lovato's seventh studio album Dancing with the Devil... the Art of Starting Over.

Background and promotion
The song was teased various times by Marshmello through his social media accounts; shortly prior to its release, in July 2020, he liked fan tweets confirming the track and also captioned an Instagram photo "hello? demi?", before later removing Lovato's name from the caption. The image showed Marshmello on the phone in a dark room with an overturned lamp, bottles of alcohol and a mystery woman in the background – critics attributed this as a possible reference to the theme of the song; however, the aesthetic was later confirmed to be for Marshmello's previous single, "Baggin".

A few weeks later, on September 4, both artists announced the collaboration, with Marshmello posting a video of him scrolling through his Twitter timeline, reading tweets of fans jokingly threatening to toast him unless he releases the song. Lovato reposted the tweet, with a link to a 90s-inspired website, which included the release date and an interactive mood quiz, a Minesweeper game and a music playlist.
The song is not the only recording between the two; in 2017, a track titled "Love Don't Let Me Go" was registered to ASCAP, crediting Marshmello and Lovato, but is yet to be released.

Music videos
In August 2020, Marshmello and Lovato were seen on the set of a music video. The video was directed by Hannah Lux Davis, who has directed many of Lovato and Marshmello's past music videos.

The video takes place in a suburban neighborhood where Lovato and Marshmello both wake up in bedrooms that belong to the younger versions of themselves. Lovato and their younger version both trash the bedroom, cutting between scenes of older Lovato singing in the center. Everyone eventually strolls around their neighborhood while singing and dancing to the song, and while Marshmello rolls around the front yard and rides his bike. The video ends with information about "Hope for the Day" and resources for suicide prevention.

A music video for the Duke & Jones remix of the song was released on October 2, 2020.

Credits and personnel
Credits adapted from YouTube.

 Hannah Lux Davis director and editor 
 Aaron Johnson producer
 Brandon Bonfiglio producer
 Carlos Veron director of photography 
 Erin Wysocki editor 
 London Alley production company

Credits and personnel
Credits adapted from Tidal.
 Marshmello – production, keyboards, programming
 Demi Lovato – songwriting, vocals
 Gregory Hein – songwriting
 James Gutch – songwriting
 James Nicholas Bailey – songwriting
 Mitch Allan – engineering, vocal production
 Michelle Mancini – mastering
 Manny Marroquin – mixing

Charts

Weekly charts

Year-end charts

Release history

References

External links
 Official website

2020 singles
2020 songs
Marshmello songs
Songs about depression
Songs about suicide
Songs about the COVID-19 pandemic
Demi Lovato songs
Songs written by Marshmello
Songs written by Demi Lovato
Songs written by Nick Bailey
Music videos directed by Hannah Lux Davis
Island Records singles
Songs written by Gregory Hein